StreetEasy is a real estate listing and technology company, launched in 2006, that operates in the New York metropolitan area. Real estate listing information is provided via the website and mobile applications.

Company History
StreetEasy was founded by Michael Smith, Sebastian Delmont, Doug Chertok, and Nataly Kogan in 2005 as NMD Interactive.  The StreetEasy.com website launched in 2006. The company raised an initial $400k from investors including Global Strategy Group, Southpaw Capital Management and Sig Zises. The company received an additional $2.5M investment from FA Technology Ventures in 2006.

The company's founders had no traditional experience in the real estate sector and created the site to fill a gap in the New York real estate listing market.

The company became popular by aggregating real estate listings into a single location. Listings were published with price changes and information like days the property had been on the market. This information was previously unavailable to the public and by 2008 the company's website was averaging 4.5 million page views per month.

In 2013 StreetEasy was acquired by Zillow for $50M with the understanding the website would be run independent of Zillow. Within a year most of the original senior staff had left and CEO Michael Smith was replaced with Zillow's Susan Daimler.

In 2017 the company launched a new paid listing model and began charging real estate brokers $3 a day for rental listings. In 2021 the company reported 180 million visits to its website and app. It is estimated that eighty percent of people searching for a home in New York City used StreetEasy or one of the affiliated Zillow Group websites. By 2022, the listing fee was raised to $6 a day for rental listings, though fees were reduced throughout the pandemic. The company also charges fees for other features, such as StreetEasy Experts, Agent Spotlight and Featured Listings.

StreetEasy was named on the list of Crain's NY's "Best Companies to Work For" in 2015, 2017, 2018, & 2019.

Software

StreetEasy provides consumers access to real estate listing information and data via their website and mobile application. The ability to collect accurate and up-to-date real estate listings in NY's MLS challenged, urban high-rise cityscape has long differentiated the company from other real estate listing databases.

Real estate listings are often accompanied by building information including number of total units, current and past units for sale and for rent, building amenities and public permit information. Additionally, information on nearby public transportation and schools is provided alongside listing information such as photos, floor plans, videos, days on market, price changes, amenities, open houses and listing broker information.

The company has won Webby awards for Best Use of GPS or Location Technology People's Voice in 2015 and Best App & Software in the Real Estate category in 2016 and 2017. In 2018, the company won a Shorty Award for Best Social Media in the Real Estate category.

In 2022, the company released StreetScape, an augmented reality feature on IOS that allows users to walk down the street using the app to see information on buildings and available units for sale and rent.

Data

The company's unique access to data from real estate searches and listing information has allowed them to release monthly market data reports on their website and several yearly lists including:

 NYC Housing Market Predictions 
 Rent Affordability Report 
 NYC Neighborhoods to Watch 

These data sets are used by various media sources such as the New York Times, NY Post, TimeOut, Crain's, Bloomberg, and Curbed to create NYC real estate market coverage.

References

External links
 Official Website

Online real estate databases
Real estate valuation
American companies established in 2006
Real estate companies established in 2006
Internet properties established in 2006
American real estate websites